Isaac Johnson (1808 – 5 October 1874) was an English first-class cricketer active 1840–43 who played for Nottinghamshire. He was born in England and died in Nottingham. He appeared in two first-class matches.

Notes

1808 births
1874 deaths
English cricketers
Nottinghamshire cricketers